The World Fantasy Awards are given each year by the World Fantasy Convention for the best fantasy fiction published in English during the previous calendar year. The awards have been described by book critics such as The Guardian as a "prestigious fantasy prize", and one of the three most prestigious speculative fiction awards, along with the Hugo and Nebula Awards (which cover both fantasy and science fiction). The World Fantasy Award—Novel is given each year for fantasy novels published in English or translated into English. A work of fiction is defined by the organization as a novel if it is 40,000 words or longer; awards are also given out for pieces of shorter lengths in the Short Fiction and Novella categories. The Novel category has been awarded annually since 1975.

World Fantasy Award nominees and winners are decided by attendees and judges at the annual World Fantasy Convention. A ballot is posted in June for attendees of the current and previous two conferences to determine two of the finalists, and a panel of five judges adds three or more nominees before voting on the overall winner. The panel of judges is typically made up of fantasy authors and is chosen each year by the World Fantasy Awards Administration, which has the power to break ties. The final results are presented at the World Fantasy Convention at the end of October. Winners were presented with a statue in the form of a bust of H. P. Lovecraft through the 2015 awards; more recent winners receive a statuette of a tree.

During the 47 nomination years, 167 authors have had works nominated; 49 of them have won, including ties. Five authors have won twice: Gene Wolfe, out of eight nominations; Tim Powers, out of five; Patricia McKillip, out of four; Jeffrey Ford, out of three; and James K. Morrow for both of his nominations. Wolfe has the most nominations for an author who has won at least once, while Stephen King has the most nominations without winning, at nine, followed by Charles L. Grant at six and Jonathan Carroll at five.

Winners and nominees
In the following table, the years correspond to the date of the ceremony, rather than when the novel was first published. Each year links to the corresponding "year in literature". Entries with a blue background and an asterisk (*) next to the writer's name have won the award; those with a white background are the other nominees on the shortlist.

  *   Winners

Notes

References

External links
 World Fantasy Convention official site

Awards established in 1975
Novel